The Case Against Tomorrow is a collection of science fiction stories by American writer Frederik Pohl, first published by Ballantine Books in May 1957.

Contents
 "The Midas Plague" (from Galaxy Science Fiction, April 1954)
 "The Census Takers" (The Magazine of Fantasy & Science Fiction, February 1956)
 "The Candle Lighter" (Galaxy Science Fiction, March 1955)
 "The Celebrated No-Hit Inning" (Fantastic Universe, September 1956)
 "Wapshot's Demon" (Science Fiction Stories, July 1956)
 "My Lady Green Sleeves" (Galaxy Science Fiction, February 1957)

References

1957 short story collections
Short story collections by Frederik Pohl
Ballantine Books books